Lisa Edmonds (née O'Nion) (born 5 June 1967 in Hertfordshire, England)  is a wheelchair basketball player from Australia.  She was part of the silver medal-winning Australia women's national wheelchair basketball team at the 2000 Summer Paralympics. She retired from competitive wheelchair basketball in 2013 and is regarded as one of the pioneers of the women's game in Australia.

Wheelchair Basketball

Career

At the age of 20, Craig Jarvis, a Sport and Recreation Officer at the Prince of Wales Hospital Spinal Cord Injuries Unit, introduced Edmonds to wheelchair basketball. She stated that: I left the hospital, bought a basketball and pushed up and down the street trying to bounce the ball. I absolutely loved the challenge and being active.   Edmonds was part of the birth of women's wheelchair basketball in Australia. In 1989, she was a member of the training/selection camp for the first ever National women's team, now known as the Gliders. This camp was organized by Susan Hobbs. Edmonds went on to play 104 games for Australia from 1989 to 2002 and represented Australia at three Summer Paralympics.  She was captain of the National team in 2002.

Edmonds played for the North Sydney Bears (now Stacks Goudkamp Bears) in the Women's National Wheelchair Basketball League since its inception in 2000. She was named in the League's All Star Five for four consecutive years - 2000 to 2003. She retired from competitive wheelchair basketball in September 2013.  On her retirement she commented: If you start playing wheelchair basketball and fall in love with it and want to be the best you can be, you have to live it, breathe it, dream it and make the basketball something you can't be without, and in some cases the wheelchair!.

Representative Summary
On her retirement in September 2013, Edmonds representative career for Australia spanned from 1989 to 2002.  She played for Australia 44 times in official international competitions and 60 times in other international competitions.

Education
In the England she attended, Woodlands Primary School and Nicholas Hawksmoor. In 2008, she completed an Advanced Diploma Event Management (TAFE).

References

Paralympic wheelchair basketball players of Australia
Paralympic silver medalists for Australia
Wheelchair category Paralympic competitors
Wheelchair basketball players at the 2000 Summer Paralympics
Wheelchair basketball players at the 1996 Summer Paralympics
Wheelchair basketball players at the 1992 Summer Paralympics
Living people
1967 births
Medalists at the 2000 Summer Paralympics
People with paraplegia
Paralympic medalists in wheelchair basketball